Lake Shegue is a lake in the Pasco Region of Peru.

See also
List of lakes in Peru

References
INEI, Compendio Estadistica 2007, page 26

Lakes of Peru
Lakes of Pasco Region